Dhoke Qadu is a village and union council, an administrative subdivision, of Chakwal District in the Punjab Province of Pakistan. It is part of Chakwal Tehsil.

References

Dhoke Qadu

Union councils of Chakwal District
Populated places in Chakwal District